The Town of Monument is a Home rule town situated at the base of the Rampart Range in El Paso County, Colorado, United States. Monument is one of the three communities that make up the Tri-Lakes area (along with Palmer Lake and Woodmoor). The town is part of the Colorado Springs Metropolitan Statistical Area, which had an estimated population of 700,000 in 2019. Monument is bordered by Pike National Forest on the west, Colorado Springs and the United States Air Force Academy to the south, Bald Mountain, True Mountain, and Spruce Mountain to the north, and Black Forest and rolling plains to the east. Monument was first settled as a stop along the Rio Grande Railroad in 1872, and the area was incorporated as a town called Henry's Station in 1879, but the name was later changed to Monument.  The town population was 10,399 at the 2020 United States Census, an increase from the population of 5,530 in 2010 and 1,971 in 2000. On April 1st, 2019, the town declared itself to be a Second Amendment sanctuary.

History

Monument's first homesteaders arrived in 1865 to mark out the town's preliminary shape, but settlement increased when Monument became a stop along the Rio Grande Railroad in 1872. The area was incorporated as a town called Henry's Station, after prominent settler Henry Limbach, on June 2, 1879, and the first town meeting was held July 3, 1879. However, three years later the name was changed to Monument after Monument Creek and Monument Rock in the west. The first records of the town can be found in various volumes in the El Paso County Courthouse dating back to 1872.  With the help of the railroad, which brought in necessities, people started small businesses and started to create a town.

Geography
It is north of Colorado Springs and the United States Air Force Academy, and east of the Rampart Range, which is the eastern front range of the Rocky Mountains. Monument Creek, a gentle mountain stream beginning in the Rampart Range, eventually tumbles down through Palmer Lake and the west side of Monument to become one of the main waterways flowing south through Colorado Springs. The town of Monument is situated on the southern slope of Palmer Divide, a significant geographical feature which separates the Arkansas and South Platte basins.

Demographics

As of the census of 2000, there were 1,971 people, 725 households, and 550 families residing in the town. The racial makeup of the town was 91.98% White, 0.91% African American, 1.42% Native American, 0.96% Asian, 2.03% from other races, and 2.69% from two or more races. Hispanic or Latino of any race were 7.71% of the population.

There were 725 households, out of which 45.4% had children under the age of 18 living with them, 59.2% were married couples living together, 11.9% had a female householder with no husband present, and 24.1% were non-families. 19.0% of all households were made up of individuals, and 3.6% had someone living alone who was 65 years of age or older. The average household size was 2.72 and the average family size was 3.12.

In the town, the population was spread out, with 32.9% under the age of 18, 6.8% from 18 to 24, 38.3% from 25 to 44, 17.7% from 45 to 64, and 4.3% who were 65 years of age or older. The median age was 31 years. For every 100 females, there were 97.7 males. For every 100 females age 18 and over, there were 95.0 males.

The median income for a household in the town was $50,000, and the median income for a family was $54,211. Males had a median income of $41,071 versus $27,583 for females. The per capita income for the town was $19,878. About 5.4% of families and 5.0% of the population were below the poverty line, including 5.4% of those under age 18 and 7.4% of those age 65 or over.

Government

Monument is a Home Rule Town and is under a Home Rule Charter. This means that the governmental policy is established by the board of trustees. There are seven Trustees, including the mayor. The mayor is considered part of the Board of Trustees, and has the same power as the other Trustees. Trustees are elected for overlapping 4-year terms, and the mayor is elected for four years as well. A vacancy in office will be filled by Trustee appointment or by voters at a regular or special election. There is a set term limit of two consecutive terms for the mayor and Trustees. All regular and special meetings must be open to the public, and people must be given the opportunity to be heard.

Education

By Colorado law, Monument is a school-choice community. Because of this, there are opportunities for public schools, private schools, charter schools, and home schooling groups. The public school system is Lewis-Palmer School District 38. Lewis-Palmer District ACT scores (at 23) are about 20% higher than the average state scores (at 19) in the two high schools, Palmer Ridge and Lewis-Palmer. The Lewis-Palmer district as a whole performs 15-20% better on CSAP tests than the Colorado state average. There are five public elementary schools in District 38:  Lewis-Palmer Elementary, Palmer Lake Elementary, Kilmer, Prairie Winds Elementary, and Bear Creek Elementary.  There is one public middle school serving all of District 38: Lewis-Palmer Middle School. Monument Academy is the only charter school and serves grades K through 8.

Organizations
The residents of Monument support and participate in many different organizations. It is home to various types of churches, such as Presbyterian, Catholic, Lutheran, Mennonite , Methodist, and nondenominational. Monument has several organizations that are unique to the community, and also several nationwide organizations. Some notable organizations in Monument include:

 The Pikes Peak Library District which serves Monument, Colorado Springs, and the surrounding areas.
 Several Boy Scout Troops including Boy Scout Troop 514 which is in possession of the Challenger flag, the USA flag that was aboard the final ill-fated mission of the Challenger Space Shuttle.
 A chapter of Kiwanis International.
 Friends of Monument Preserve, a volunteer organization that works in partnership with the US Forest Service to protect and maintain historical and recreational lands in and around Monument.
 Tri-Lakes Cares, a volunteer-supported organization that primarily serves economically disadvantaged individuals in the Tri-Lakes area.

Transportation
The greater Monument area is bisected north/south by interstate 25 and can be accessed via exits 158 and 161. Interstate 25 passes over the top of Monument Hill which frequently experiences hazardous road conditions, particularly in the winter months; automobile accidents and traffic jams are common in this stretch of interstate which serves as the primary land connection between Colorado's two largest population centers: Denver and Colorado Springs. State Highway 105 also runs east/west through Monument. A section of railway (formerly, the Colorado and Southern Railway, now owned by BNSF) also runs parallel to interstate 25 through Monument that is used primarily for coal transport; there is currently no passenger service on this rail line. The only form of public transportation that exists in Monument is a park & ride bus stop for the Bustang, Colorado's interregional express bus service. Rideshare services like Lyft and Uber are becoming more accessible in Monument as a benefit of the town's close proximity to Colorado Springs. Lyft and Uber currently service all of Monument and much of the Tri-Lakes area as part of their Colorado Springs services.

Climate
Monument experiences a hemiboreal continental climate (Köppen Dfb) with warm, relatively rainy summers and cold, snowy winters. As with many areas of Colorado, Monument experiences a lot of sunshine with an average of 250 sunny days per year. The semi-arid climate keeps the dew point very low in Monument year-round and causes the air to feel quite dry. Monument is part of the Front Range urban corridor and lies on the southern slope of Monument Hill. The town is situated near the western terminus of the Palmer Divide, a low-grade ridge that extends Eastward from the Front Range and has a significant impact on Monument's climate. With the top of Monument Hill reaching 7,352 feet above sea level, Monument is one of the highest communities in the Front Range urban corridor. The combination of high elevation, uniquely situated geography, semi-arid climate, and freezing cold winter months causes the town of Monument to receive considerably more snow each year than its neighboring cities. Colorado Springs (20 miles to the South) receives an average of 33 inches of snow per year and Denver (53 miles to the North) receives an average of 56 inches of snow per year, whereas the town of Monument receives an average of 110 inches of snow per year.

Notable residents
Listed in no particular order:
 Kevin J. Anderson, bestselling science fiction author
 Jennifer Barringer, professional runner and Olympian
 Robert Liparulo, bestselling thriller novelist
 Bobby Burling, professional MLS player, attended Lewis-Palmer High School
 Chumped, members of the band
 Tom Clements, former Director of the Colorado Department of Corrections, assassinated
 Pat Garrity, former NBA player
 Wayne Laugesen, journalist
 Frances McConnell-Mills, toxicologist
 Jennifer Sipes, actress and model, born in Monument, attended Lewis-Palmer High School
Paige Spiranac, professional golfer and model
Mathew Ward, Christian musician and former member of 2nd Chapter of Acts

See also

Outline of Colorado
Index of Colorado-related articles
State of Colorado
Colorado cities and towns
Colorado municipalities
Colorado counties
El Paso County, Colorado
List of statistical areas in Colorado
Front Range Urban Corridor
South Central Colorado Urban Area
Colorado Springs, CO Metropolitan Statistical Area
Palmer Divide
Rampart Range

References

External links

Town of Monument official website
CDOT map of Monument
 

Towns in El Paso County, Colorado
Towns in Colorado